The Copa Alagoas is a tournament organized by Federação Alagoana de Futebol every second half of the season. The champions qualify for the Campeonato Brasileiro Série D.

History
Founded in 2005 as the second phase of the Campeonato Alagoano, the Copa Alagoas was a part of the tournament in the 2005, 2006 and 2007 editions. After the tournament's change of format, the competition was not disputed until 2014 and 2015, when it became again a part of the Alagoano, but now the first phase.

From the 2016 to the 2019 campaigns, Copa Alagoas was not disputed. The competition returned to an active status in 2020, being now an independent tournament and assuring a place in the Campeonato Brasileiro Série D to the champion.

List of champions
As a part of the Campeonato Alagoano

As a separated tournament

Titles by team

References

Football in Alagoas
Recurring sporting events established in 2005